Piat may refer to:

 PIAT, Projector, Infantry, Anti-Tank - an anti-tank weapon 
 Piat, Cagayan, a municipality in the Philippines
 Saint Piatus (Piat, Piato, Piaton)
 Church of Saint-Piat, in Tournai
 Maurice Piat (born 1941), a Roman Catholic cardinal from Mauritius

See also
Piatt, a surname